Frank McKenzie or MacKenzie may refer to

 Frank MacKenzie (politician) (1873–1932), Canadian politician
 Frank McKenzie (footballer), Scottish footballer
 Kenneth F. McKenzie Jr., American military general
 Frank Mackenzie Ross (1891–1971), lieutenant governor of British Columbia

See also
 Francis MacKenzie (disambiguation)